Lebanon Municipal Airport  is a city-owned public-use airport located two nautical miles (4 km) southwest of the central business district of Lebanon, a city in Wilson County, Tennessee, United States. This airport is included in the National Plan of Integrated Airport Systems for 2011–2015, which categorized it as a general aviation airport.

Facilities and aircraft 
Lebanon Municipal Airport covers an area of 256 acres (104 ha) at an elevation of 588 feet (179 m) above mean sea level. It has two runways: 1/19 is 5,000 by 100 feet (1,524 x 30 m) with an asphalt pavement and 4/22 is 1,801 by 150 feet (549 x 46 m) with a turf surface.

For the 12-month period ending April 12, 2010, the airport had 10,946 aircraft operations, an average of 29 per day: 93% general aviation, 6% air taxi, and 1% military. At that time there were 70 aircraft based at this airport: 81% single-engine, 6% multi-engine, 3% jet, 4% helicopter, and 6% ultralight.

References

External links 
 Lebanon Municipal Airport page at City of Lebanon website
 Direct Flight Solutions, the fixed-base operator (FBO)
 Aerial image as of March 1997 from USGS The National Map
 
 

Airports in Tennessee
Buildings and structures in Wilson County, Tennessee
Transportation in Wilson County, Tennessee